Adam Anderson may refer to:

 Adam Anderson (American football), American football player
 Adam Anderson (economist) (c. 1693–1765), Scottish economist
 Adam Anderson (monster truck driver) (born 1985), American monster truck driver
 Adam Anderson (musician) (born 1984), member of the British synthpop duo Hurts
 Adam Anderson (physicist) (1783–1846), Scottish writer on physics and encyclopedist
 Adam Anderson (tennis) (born 1969), Australian tennis player
 Adam Anderson, Lord Anderson (c.  1797–1853), Scottish judge